Rikke Mæng Ibsen (born 30 November 1990) is a Danish sport shooter.

She participated at the 2018 ISSF World Shooting Championships, winning a medal.

References

External links

Living people
1990 births
Danish female sport shooters
ISSF rifle shooters
People from Herning Municipality
European Games competitors for Denmark
Shooters at the 2015 European Games
Shooters at the 2019 European Games
Olympic shooters of Denmark
Shooters at the 2020 Summer Olympics
Sportspeople from the Central Denmark Region
21st-century Danish women